Shardul Rathod is an Indian film writer. He works for entertainment as a screenwriter & film director since 2003. He was born in Delhi. He has a PhD in Hindi. He knows many languages: Hindi, English, Urdu, Rajasthani, and Brij. He moved to Mumbai in 2003 and started working in the Indian film industry as a scriptwriter. He has done many musical albums with T-series and with Anup Jalota. He has done more than six animated films for kids for Landmark Toonz Hydrabad, India. He specialises in action comedy films and has written many series for television.

Early life
After competition of his study, he started his profession in medical practice.

Career
Rathod started his career in 2003, as a lyricist & dialogue writer,

Discography 

Shardul Rathod wrote and composed (with Meet Bros and Manoj Muntashir) the blockbuster song Dil Galti Kar Baitha Hai, sung by Jubin Nautiyal, released by T-Series, 
YouTube approved his channel as Official Artist Channel

Screenwriter 
As a writer from 2003
 Wrote title song for TV serial "Dharamputra" (sung by Sunidhi Chauhan music by Daboo Malik 
 Makasad Hindi film Mithun Chakraborty and Om Puri
 Marriage da Garriage  Punjabi film Starrer- Shakti Kapoor, Upasna Singh Razzak Khan
 TV Serial Andher Nagari Chaupat Raja (reconstruction)
 Animation Film Bhakta Prahalad by Sanjeev Shah of Landmark Toonz
 Animation Film Jhansi Ki Rani by Sanjeev Shah of Land Mark Toonz
 Animation Film Abhimanyu by Sanjeev Shah of Landmark Toonz
 Animation Film Luv-Kush by Sanjiv Shah of Landmark Toonz
 Animation Film Kaddu and Kukki by Sanjeev Shah of Landmark Toon
 7–8 Other Animation Films in other languages 
 More Than 20 South Indian Film in Hindi By Kioshi And Others
 Hindi Feature Film Bass Ek Tamanna (2011), music by Ishak sarotiyawala
 Hindi Feature Film Molly (lyrics writer)By Rajeev Gupta
 More Than 300 Songs With T-Series Mumbai 
 working on Hindi Feature Film Maqsadd (As a writer) with Anup Jalota Mumbai
 Another film (Mannu Bhai Enn Aar Aayi)  
 A comedy film Kaam Chaloo Hai with Anil Kapoor Productions, Mumbai
 Up to 40 Songs for Hindi Feature Films in Mumbai
 Completed One Historical TV Serial for Farook Sayed (1040 Episodes)
 Doing Two Films (The Lake and Missing) with Director N. Mohla 
 Film (Let's Change) for Dilzan Wadia
 Suhani Yaadein for DD Urdu as Music Composer and Lyricist.
 Hindi Feature Film "Mumbai Night Club" Suhaib Saabri of AAnas films Mumbai
 Music Album "Dil Galati kar baitha Hai" Sung by Zubin Nautiyal (SCI) Mumbai

References

External links
 
 

1968 births
English-language writers from India
Indian male composers
Living people
Rajasthani people
Musicians from Mumbai